Farshid Karimi (born May 10, 1976) is a retired Iranian football goalkeeper. He is older brother of Ali Karimi.

Club career

Persepolis 
He started his career with Persepolis in 2000 when the club needed a goalkeeper, and he was introduced to 2007–08 Ali Parvin by Sadegh Doroudgar to be on trial with the club. He joined Persepolis and played 8 seasons for them. He was Persepolis's first choice goalkeeper during 2005–06 and 2006–07 seasons, and he became one of the key players of the team in the 2005–06 Hazfi Cup. In the 2007–08 season, he became a benchwarmer after Hassan Roudbarian and Mehdi Vaezi and played just one match, which was his last appearance for Persepolis. On the match on February 10, 2008 against Aboumoslem he played mistakenly, conceding 3 goals in the first half and was booed by the fans, In the half time, he was asked by IRIB Reporter about his performance. "I have nothing to say", he replied. Persepolis scored in the second half making a 3-3 draw.

Damash 
He moved to the Gilani Club Damash in 2008–09 and was Second Goalie of Ali Nazarmohammadi. He had problems with the Club after Amir Abedini did not pay his wage in time, so he complained and left training. Abedini Fired him from the club. He was later fined about $2000 of his contract due to "his insolence to Chairman Abedini" and returned to trainings after compromise with the club.

Rah Ahan 
He joined Rah Ahan in 2009. He played one season alongside Masoud Homami. He remained in the next season with the club. Other goalies were Hassan Roudbarian and Saleh Khalil Azad. He rejected a transfer to Steel Azin in December 2010. He was released by the club on 1 July 2013.

Aluminium 
In summer 2013, he signed a two years contract with Aluminium, who relegated from Iran Pro League to Division 1 last season.

Club career statistics

International career
He was called up for team melli once by Amir Ghalenoei in 2006, but never made a debut.

Honours
Persepolis
Iran Pro League (2): 2001–02, 2007–08

References
Iran Pro League Stats

Iranian footballers
Association football goalkeepers
Persepolis F.C. players
1976 births
Living people
Pegah Gilan players
Rah Ahan players
Damash Gilan players
Persian Gulf Pro League players
People from Lahijan
Sportspeople from Gilan province